The Florida Bobcats were an Arena Football League (AFL) team based in Sunrise, Florida. They were previously known as the Sacramento Attack and the Miami Hooters, and played in the AFL for a total of ten seasons, the last seven in West Palm Beach and Sunrise in the Miami metropolitan area.

The team was founded in 1992 as the Sacramento Attack, based in Sacramento, California. After their first season they relocated to Miami as the Miami Hooters, so named through a marketing deal with the restaurant chain Hooters. After three seasons the Hooters sponsorship was dropped and the team moved north to Sunrise where it changed its name. They folded after the 2001 season after years of weak attendance and poor performance. During their run they made two playoff appearances, once in Sacramento and once in Miami.

History

Sacramento Attack (1992)

The Sacramento Attack was an Arena Football League team that competed under that name in the 1992 AFL season only.  They played at ARCO Arena (now Sleep Train Arena) for that season.  The team was originally supposed to play in Los Angeles as the Los Angeles Wings, but the franchise never came into existence in Los Angeles, and moved to Sacramento, California as the Attack.

Miami Hooters (1993–1995)
After their inaugural season, the team relocated to Miami, Florida. They took the name Miami Hooters in an unusual marketing arrangement with the Florida-based restaurant chain Hooters, which was ordinarily more noted for its buxom waitresses than feats of athletic prowess. Naturally, the team adopted the restaurant's owlish logo and trademark colors as its own for three years, until this unusual arrangement terminated after the completion of the 1995 season. Desirous of staying in the general South Florida area, the team relocated to West Palm Beach as the Florida Bobcats. Subsequent linking of team names with products was to occur, notably the AFL's own New Jersey Red Dogs and the Toronto Phantoms (named for Phantom Industries, a manufacturer of women's hosiery), and the Detroit Neon of the Continental Indoor Soccer League. Originally the team was to be named the Miami Toros or Miami Bulls, with a similar logo for each name having been created.

Florida Bobcats (1996–2001)
When the Miami Hooters team discontinued its connection with the Hooters Restaurant chain after the 1995 season, it developed both a new identity (the Bobcats) and a new color scheme involving teal and black as opposed to the former orange and brown associated with the restaurants. It also moved north to West Palm Beach in an attempt to reduce overhead. This proved to be a mixed blessing at best, however, as the relatively tiny seating capacity of the West Palm Beach Auditorium (around 6,000) made profitable operations essentially impossible. In the 1997 and 1998 seasons the team played a total of five official league games at neutral sites (in Ottawa, Boston, Los Angeles, Kansas City and Lakeland, Florida), drawing an average crowd of 5,365 -- quite an improvement over the 3,446 per game they drew in their thirteen games in West Palm Beach. This led to some wags referring to Bobcats as "America's Team", an ironic comparison to the National Football League's Dallas Cowboys. 

In 1999, the Bobcats moved into the far more spacious confines of the National Car Rental Center, also home to the Florida Panthers of the National Hockey League. Despite having over 20,000 seats in their new digs, the Bobcats attendance did not improve -- it actually dropped to an average of 3,424 in 21 home games. (The Bobcats even set the AFL all-time low attendance mark, when only 1,154 fans watched them beat the Los Angeles Avengers, 61-53, on May 3, 2001.) The club remained there until the team was folded after the completion of the 2001 season. One of the notable facts about this team is that they were quarterbacked through the majority of their existence by Fred McNair, the original "Air McNair" and older brother of 2003 NFL co-MVP Steve McNair. An attempt was made in the 2001 season to sell the team to various prospective owners, including Mark Cuban, who later bought the Dallas Mavericks of the NBA, but nothing came of the deal.

Season-by-season

Notable players

Arena Football Hall of Famers

All-Arena players
The following Attack/Hooters/Bobcats players were named to All-Arena Teams:
 WR/DB Bernard Edwards (1)
 WR/LB Niu Sale (1), Bruce LaSane (1) 
 OL/DL Alo Sila (1)
 DS Donald Brown (1)

All-Ironman players
The following Attack/Hooters/Bobcats players were named to All-Ironman Teams:
 WR/LB Curtis Ceaser, Jr. (1)

All-Rookie players
The following Attack/Hooters/Bobcats players were named to All-Rookie Teams: 
 WR/LB Curtis Ceaser, Jr.
 WR/DB Neal Stayton

Head coaches

External links
 AFL Official Website
 Sacramento Attack at ArenaFan.com
 Miami Hooters at ArenaFan.com
 Florida Bobcats at ArenaFan.com

References

 
Defunct Arena Football League teams
Arena Football League in Florida
Miami Bobcats
American football teams in Miami
Sports in West Palm Beach, Florida
Sports in Sunrise, Florida
American football teams in Florida
1996 establishments in Florida
2001 disestablishments in Florida
American football teams established in 1996
American football teams disestablished in 2001